Mark Christopher Paul Ehrenfried (born 24 June 1991) is a German pianist and composer. He has published five albums and performed concerts worldwide. In Germany, he is especially known for his childhood TV appearances, for his collaborations with pop-music producer Jack White, as well as for touring with the East-German rock band The Puhdys. Recently, Ehrenfried performs piano music of the Norwegian Romantic composer Christian Sinding. Ehrenfried also holds speeches about Christianity, music, values and culture. He describes himself as a Christian conservative.

Early life 
Mark Ehrenfried was born 24 June 1991 in Berlin and grew up as an only child in a single-parent household. He attempted to play a piano when he was three years old and took up piano lessons by the age of 4.

Career 
In July 1999, Ehrenfried performed his first full-length piano-solo concert at The Meistersaal Berlin, after which numerous TV - show appearances, interviews and a first CD album publication with Hänssler Classic followed. In 2001, Ehrenfried held a speech, honouring the social work of the singer Peter Maffay, and presented him with the German MDR / RBB annual TV award.

Former footballer and music producer Jack White introduced Mark Ehrenfried to popular music and music composition. They decided to work together, producing pop-classical crossover music. In 2002, Mark Ehrenfried published his first pop music album with Sony BMG and appeared on Swiss television, performing the opening of Tchaikovsky's first piano concerto in front of the Victoria Waterfalls in Harare, Zimbabwe. He performed twice alongside José Carreras on TV, raising money for the international José Carreras Leukaemia Foundation

Mark Ehrenfried continued producing pop and rock music for several years, most notably with The Puhdys, with whom he went on tour and co-produced several songs.

Mark Ehrenfried was artistic and cultural partner for Ratiopharm under the World-in-balance initiative, where he worked with actor and philanthropist Karlheinz Böhm and explorer Arved Fuchs. He also held inspirational speeches in schools and universities, combining concert performances with lectures and lessons.

From 2010 to 2013, he led piano - solo concerts in Berlin, such as the Berliner Philharmonie Konzerthaus and Gendarmenmarkt.

From 2016 onwards, Mark Ehrenfried raises awareness about Norwegian classical composers' Christian Sinding's piano solo music, to which Ehrenfried's 2017 album "Mark Ehrenfried plays Christian Sinding", is entirely devoted to.

Ehrenfried identifies Christianity as the root of western culture, music and art.
He works closely together with several Christian organisations, and is often invited to discussions.

Education 

Mark Ehrenfried was home-schooled, but has also intermittently attended an international secondary school in Berlin. 
He holds the International Baccalaureate Diploma.

Ehrenfried graduated from Regent's University London in 2016, with a Bachelor of Arts in Global Business with Japanese.

He also holds a Licentiate in Piano Performance from the Royal Schools of Music.

Private life 

Mark Ehrenfried is married and lives in London, United Kingdom.

Discography 
 2001: Meine Lieblingsstücke
 2002: Gestatten
 2002: Mark Ehrenfried Plays Bach, Mozart, Haydn, Beethoven Et Al
 Live im Kammermusiksaal der Berliner Philharmonie (2-piece album)
 2017: Mark Ehrenfried Plays Christian Sinding
2018: Somewhere (Live)
2020: Tomorrow (Instrumental)

Filmography 
 2002: Danke, Anke (TV series)
 2003: Zauberhafte Heimat (TV series)
 2006: Die Mozartshow

References

External links 
 
 
 

1991 births
German pianists
Living people
21st-century pianists